is a former Japanese football player. He played for the Japan national team.

Club career
Kono was born in Hiroshima Prefecture on December 30, 1950. After graduating from high school, he joined Hitachi in 1969. In 1972, the club won Japan Soccer League and Emperor's Cup. The club also won 1975 Emperor's Cup and 1976 JSL Cup. He retired in 1980 after having played 113 games in the league.

National team career
On February 20, 1974, Kono debuted for the Japan national team against Hong Kong.

Club statistics

National team statistics

References

External links
 
 Japan National Football Team Database

1950 births
Living people
Association football people from Hiroshima Prefecture
Japanese footballers
Japan international footballers
Japan Soccer League players
Kashiwa Reysol players
Association football defenders